Benjamin Veillas (born 26 February 1983) is a French rally co-driver competing on a part-time basis with Sébastien Ogier for Toyota Gazoo Racing WRT in the FIA World Rally Championship.

Biography
They are set to contest selected events for Toyota Gazoo Racing WRT. 

At the 2022 Monte Carlo Rally the French pair finished second overall, after they got a puncture in the penultimate stage.

WRC victories

Rally results

WRC results

* Season still in progress.

References

External links

 Benjamin Veillas's e-wrc profile

1983 births
Living people
French rally co-drivers
World Rally Championship co-drivers